Perry Hill is a historic home located near Saint Joy, Buckingham County, Virginia. It was built about 1851–1852, and is a two-story, brick dwelling in the Gothic Revival style.  It has a central hall plan and features pointed arch windows and hipped roof with gables.

It was listed on the National Register of Historic Places in 1980.

References

Houses on the National Register of Historic Places in Virginia
Gothic Revival architecture in Virginia
Houses completed in 1852
Houses in Buckingham County, Virginia
National Register of Historic Places in Buckingham County, Virginia
1852 establishments in Virginia